Dixon Island is an island of the Canadian Arctic Archipelago, in the territory of Nunavut. It lies in the Franklin Strait, south of Hobday Island and the much larger Prince of Wales Island.

Uninhabited islands of Kitikmeot Region